Știuca (Romanian for "pike"; ;) is a commune in Timiș County, Romania. It is composed of four villages: Dragomirești, Oloșag, Știuca (commune seat) and Zgribești.

Name

History 
The first mention of Știuca dates back to 1585, but it is about praedium or terra Stukatth and not about a cohesive locality. The village was practically founded by German settlers between 1784–1787. They named it Ebendorf, a name it bore until 1901. The German settlers came from various regions, the first being from Luxembourg, followed by those from Württemberg, Bavaria and Austria. Slovaks and Germans from Bohemia later settled. Through school and church, through mixed marriages, the Slovaks were assimilated over time by the German population. The Știuca–Sălbăgel estate was once owned by the barons of the Brukenthal house. In 1786, 60 families of 214 people, mostly from Luxembourg, settled in Știuca. From 1867, during the Hungarian administration, the village was named Csukás. Since 1919 the village is called Știuca. Starting in 1966, Ukrainians from Maramureș County, which currently represents the majority of the population, began to settle in Știuca. Most ethnic Germans emigrated to the FRG in 1990.

Demographics 

Știuca had a population of 1,813 inhabitants at the 2011 census, down 1% from the 2002 census. Most inhabitants are Ukrainians (62.82%), with a minority of Romanians (34.09%). For 1.65% of the population, ethnicity is unknown. In terms of religion, there is no majority religion, the inhabitants being Orthodox (48.26%), Pentecostals (26.64%), Old Believers (7.5%), Baptists (1.43%) and Roman Catholics (1.1%). For 2.15% of the population, religious affiliation is unknown.

Gallery

References 

Communes in Timiș County
Localities in Romanian Banat